Pir Mahal is a city and headquarters of Pir Mahal Tehsil of Toba Tek Singh District in the Punjab province of Pakistan.

References

Location of Pir Mahal - Falling Rain Genomics

Populated places in Toba Tek Singh District